Juan Pérez de Espinosa, O.F.M. (1558 – 31 October 1622) was a Roman Catholic prelate who served as Bishop of Santiago de Chile (1600–1622).

Biography
Juan Pérez de Espinosa was born in Castilla la Vieja, Spain in 1558 and ordained a priest in the Order of Friars Minor on 10 August 1575.
On 12 May 1600, he was appointed during the papacy of Pope Clement VIII as Bishop of Santiago de Chile.
On 25 July 1600, he was consecrated bishop by Domenico Ginnasi, Archbishop of Manfredonia, with Juan Pedro González de Mendoza, Bishop Emeritus of Lipari, and Martín Vasquez de Arce, Bishop of Puerto Rico, serving as co-consecrators. 
He served as Bishop of Santiago de Chile until his death on 31 October 1622.

References 

17th-century Roman Catholic bishops in Chile
Bishops appointed by Pope Clement VIII
1558 births
1622 deaths
Franciscan bishops
Roman Catholic bishops of Santiago de Chile